The Disposable Film Festival (DFF) is an annual juried international festival of short films made using casual, lo-fi video capture devices like cell phones, point and shoot cameras, webcams, and inexpensive handycams. It also features artist profile screenings of filmmakers working in these media and hosts educational film workshops.

Through screenings, workshops, competitions, panels, and other events intended to educate and inspire, the Disposable Film Festival promotes experimentation and helps build the track record needed for a new generation of filmmakers to enter and change the industry. Disposable kicks off in San Francisco every March before traveling to cities around the world.

History 

The Disposable Film Festival was founded in San Francisco in 2007 by Carlton Evans and Eric Slatkin, who became the co-directors of the festival. As a result of the Disposable Film Festival, the terms "disposable film," "disposable video," and "disposable filmmaking" have come to refer to the practice of making video in a do-it-yourself aesthetic that is less reliant on formal filmmaking training and more on experimentation with easily  available technology.

Through screenings, workshops, competitions, panels, and other events intended to educate and inspire, the Disposable Film Festival promotes experimentation and helps build the track record needed for a new generation of filmmakers to enter and change the industry. Disposable kicks off in San Francisco every March before traveling to cities around the world.

In addition to screenings and exhibition programming, the DFF team works year round to extend the educational experiences of accessible storytelling and production with a diverse community through the Disposable Film Projects, including Film Access Educational Programs and Social Action Film Projects.

The first DFF event was held at Artists' Television Access on January 19, 2008. The program then went on to play at venues across world, including screenings in conjunction with the Portable Film Festival based in Melbourne, Australia, at South by Southwest in Austin, Texas, the New Media Meeting in Norrköping, Sweden, and at Jonas Mekas's Anthology Film Archives in New York.

Festival Chronology

Honors 
The Disposable Film Festival was named one of the world's 25 coolest film festivals in the Summer 2009 issue of MovieMaker Magazine.

See also
Juried (competition)

External resources 
 Disposable Film Festival official site
 New York Times article about The Disposable Film Festival, November 4, 2008
 San Francisco Chronicle article about The Disposable Film Festival, August 9, 2008
 Wired Magazine article about The Disposable Film Festival, March 3, 2010
 Twitch article about The Disposable Film Festival, August 4, 2011
 Ted Hope article The Disposable Film Festival, December 30, 2011
 Wall Street Journal article The Disposable Film Festival, March 14, 2012
 Singularity Hub article The Disposable FIlm Festival, March 23, 2012
 Smart Movie Making Blog The Disposable Film Festival, May 8, 2012
 The Guardian UK article The Disposable Film Festival, May 17, 2012
 The Toronto Star article The Disposable Film Festival, June 7, 2012

References 

Film festivals in the San Francisco Bay Area
Short film festivals in the United States